There were several special elections to the United States House of Representatives in 1937 during the 76th United States Congress.

List of elections 

|-
! 
| Stephen W. Gambrill
| 
| 1924 
|  | Incumbent died December 19, 1938.New member elected February 3, 1939.Democratic hold.
| nowrap | 

|-
! 
| Clarence W. Turner
| 
| 1932
|  | Incumbent died March 23, 1939.New member elected May 11, 1939.Democratic hold.
| nowrap | 

|-
! 
| Thomas A. Goldsborough
| 
| 1920
|  | Incumbent resigned April 5, 1939 to become justice of the U.S. District Court for the District of Columbia.New member elected June 6, 1939.Democratic hold.
| nowrap | 

|-
! 
| Emmett M. Owen
| 
| 1932
|  | Incumbent died June 21, 1939.New member elected August 1, 1939.Democratic hold.
| nowrap | 

|-
! 
| William B. Cravens
| 
| 1932
|  | Incumbent died January 13, 1939.New member elected September 12, 1939.Democratic hold.
| nowrap | 

|-
! 
| Sam D. McReynolds
| 
| 1922
|  | Incumbent died July 11, 1939.New member elected September 13, 1939.Democratic hold.
| nowrap | 

|-
! 
| Bert Lord
| 
| 1934
|  | Incumbent died May 24, 1939.New member elected November 7, 1939.Republican hold.
| nowrap | 

|-
! 
| J. Burrwood Daly
| 
| 1934
|  | Incumbent died March 12, 1939.New member elected November 7, 1939.Democratic hold.
| nowrap | 

|-
! 
| Thomas S. McMillan
| 
| 1924
|  | Incumbent died September 29, 1939.New member elected November 7, 1939.Democratic hold.
| nowrap | 

|-
! 
| J. Will Taylor
| 
| 1918
|  | Incumbent died November 14, 1939.New member elected December 30, 1939.Republican hold.
| nowrap | 

|}

References 

 
1939